Hypsilurus schultzewestrumi is a species of agama found in Papua New Guinea.

References

Hypsilurus
Reptiles described in 1999
Agamid lizards of New Guinea